National Route 268 is a national highway of Japan connecting Minamata, Kumamoto and Miyazaki, Miyazaki in Japan, with a total length of 114.3 km (71.02 mi).

References

National highways in Japan
Roads in Kagoshima Prefecture
Roads in Kumamoto Prefecture
Roads in Miyazaki Prefecture